Resende Airport  is the airport serving Resende, Brazil.

History
The airport was opened in 1941.

Airlines and destinations
No scheduled flights operate at this airport.

Access

See also

List of airports in Brazil

References

External links

Airports in Rio de Janeiro (state)
Airports established in 1941